Reinoud III may refer to:

 Reinoud III of Guelders (1333–1371)
 Reinoud III van Brederode (1492–1556)